Isaac Chapman Fowler (September 2, 1831, Jeffersonville, Virginia – April 29, 1905) was a Virginia politician. He represented Washington County in the Virginia House of Delegates, and served as that body's Speaker from 1881 until 1882 as a member of the Readjuster Party.

References

1831 births
1904 deaths
Speakers of the Virginia House of Delegates
People from Washington County, Virginia
Readjuster Party politicians
People from Tazewell, Virginia